Saad Hosny (born 1 January 1987) is an Egyptian footballer currently playing as a right back with Egyptian Second Division club Suez SC.

References

External links
Saad Hosny at Footballdatabase

1987 births
Living people
Egyptian footballers
Egypt international footballers
Baladeyet El Mahalla SC players
El Gouna FC players
Tala'ea El Gaish SC players
Tanta SC players
Egyptian Premier League players
Association football defenders